The Nevada County Arts Council is the official Nevada County, California, USA arts council. By resolution of Nevada County Board of supervisors, it is State-Local Partner with California Arts Council. A 501c3 not-for-profit organization, its mission is to facilitate collaborative efforts that promote and sustain the visual, literary and performing arts of Nevada County to advance the cultural, social and economic life of its rural community.

In 2017 California Arts Council selected 14 districts to serve as California's inaugural state-designated Cultural Districts. Nevada County is home to two: Grass Valley-Nevada City and Truckee.

External links
Nevada County Arts Council website

Arts councils of California
Nevada County, California